"Dance Like There's No Tomorrow" is a song by American singer Paula Abdul and American musician Randy Jackson. It was Abdul's first single release in nearly twelve years. The song was produced by DEEKAY and Randy Jackson and appears on Jackson's album Randy Jackson's Music Club, Vol. 1.

"Dance Like There's No Tomorrow" reached number two on the Billboard Dance Club Songs chart and peaked at number 62 on the Hot 100 chart. It also charted in Canada and Romania at number 68 and 87 respectively.

Release
The song was first premiered by KIIS FM in Los Angeles on January 18, 2008. It is the first single off Randy Jackson's debut album, Music Club: Volume 1 (2008).

Live performance
Paula Abdul pre-taped a performance that aired during the pre-game show for Super Bowl XLII. Abdul performed a dance routine with several back-up dancers while Jackson played bass guitar with the band. Although she lip-synced, the performance still managed to receive some favorable reviews. Jim Cantiello from MTV wrote, "sure, her pre-game performance of 'Dance Like There's No Tomorrow' was pretaped. And yes, it certainly looked like she was lip-syncing Cotillard-style. But I have to admit, I thought she nailed it." Another MTV review was less kind: "The painfully '80s Janet Jackson rip-off tune and skinny-tie-era backup dancers made Adbul  look like the Mrs. Robinson of dance pop. Judging those kids on 'Idol' just got a lot harder."

Music video

The music video was shot on January 21, 2008. Access Hollywood revealed that Simon Cowell and Ryan Seacrest would make cameos in the video and that Abdul and Rey Lozano choreographed the video. Abdul co-directed the music video with Scott Speer.

Some blogs reported that the video was banned by MTV. However, the MTV Newsroom denied this and reported that they had not seen the video, but that they would be interested in showing it on MTV.

Chart performance

References

External links
 "Dance Like There's No Tomorrow" music video on YouTube

2007 songs
2008 singles
Paula Abdul songs
Randy Jackson songs
Songs written by Lil' Eddie
Music videos directed by Scott Speer
Songs about dancing